Adryelson Shawann Lima Silva (born 23 March 1998), simply known as Adryelson, is a Brazilian footballer who plays as a central defender for Botafogo.

Club career

Sport Recife
Born in Barão de Grajaú, Maranhão, Adryelson joined Sport Recife's youth setup in 2011, aged 13. He made his first team debut on 5 April 2015, coming on as a second-half substitute for Henrique Mattos in a 1–1 Campeonato Pernambucano home draw against Santa Cruz.

On 30 June 2017, after another three first team appearances, Adryelson was loaned to Palmeiras until the end of the year, returning to the under-20s. He returned to his parent club the following 30 January, being initially a backup option.

Adryelson made his Série A debut on 5 October 2018, starting and scoring the equalizer in a 2–1 home win against Internacional. The following 7 May, he renewed his contract until December 2021.

On 24 May 2021, after already establishing himself as a regular starter, Adryelson further extended his contract until June 2023, and was loaned to Emirati club Al-Wasl for one year. Upon returning in June 2022, he took a legal action against Sport due to unpaid wages, and was allowed to leave the club for free on 11 July of that year.

International career
Adryelson represented Brazil at the 2015 South American Under-17 Football Championship, and in the 2019 Toulon Tournament.

Career statistics

Notes

Honours

Club
Sport Recife
Campeonato Pernambucano: 2017, 2019

International
Brazil U17
South American U-17 Championship: 2015

Brazil U23
Toulon Tournament: 2019

References

External links

1998 births
Living people
Sportspeople from Pernambuco
Brazilian footballers
Brazilian expatriate footballers
Association football defenders
Campeonato Brasileiro Série A players
Campeonato Brasileiro Série B players
UAE Pro League players
Sport Club do Recife players
Botafogo de Futebol e Regatas players
Al-Wasl F.C. players
Brazil youth international footballers
Expatriate footballers in the United Arab Emirates
Brazilian expatriate sportspeople in the United Arab Emirates